Dirk Jan Struik (September 30, 1894 – October 21, 2000) was a Dutch-born American (since 1934) mathematician, historian of mathematics and Marxian theoretician who spent most of his life in the U.S.

Life 
Dirk Jan Struik was born in 1894 in Rotterdam, Netherlands, as a teacher's son. He attended the Hogere Burgerschool nl (HBS) over there. It was in this school that he was first introduced to left-wing politics and socialism by one of his teachers, called Mister van Dam.

In 1912 Struik entered the University of Leiden, where he showed great interest in mathematics and physics, influenced by the eminent professors Paul Ehrenfest and Hendrik Lorentz.

In 1917 he worked as a high school mathematics teacher for a while, after which he worked as a research assistant for J.A. Schouten. It was during this period that he developed his doctoral dissertation, "The Application of Tensor Methods to Riemannian Manifolds."

In 1922 Struik obtained his doctorate in mathematics from University of Leiden. He was appointed to a teaching position at University of Utrecht in 1923. The same year he married Saly Ruth Ramler, a Czech mathematician with a doctorate from the Charles University of Prague.

In 1924, funded by a Rockefeller fellowship, Struik traveled to Rome to collaborate with the Italian mathematician Tullio Levi-Civita. It was in Rome that Struik first developed a keen interest in the history of mathematics. In 1925, thanks to an extension of his fellowship, Struik went to Göttingen to work with Richard Courant compiling Felix Klein's lectures on the history of 19th-century mathematics. He also started researching Renaissance mathematics at this time. He also rekindled interest in a mistake that Aristotle made about tiling the universe with just the tetrahedron. It was first challenged in 1435.

In 1926 Struik was offered positions both at the Moscow State University and the Massachusetts Institute of Technology. He decided to accept the latter, where he spent the rest of his academic career. He collaborated with Norbert Wiener on differential geometry, while continuing his research on the history of mathematics. He was made full professor at MIT in 1940.

Struik was a steadfast Marxist. Having joined the Communist Party of the Netherlands in 1919, he remained a Party member his entire life. When asked, upon the occasion of his 100th birthday, how he managed to pen peer-reviewed journal articles at such an advanced age, Struik replied blithely that he had the "3Ms" a man needs to sustain himself: Marriage (his wife, Saly Ruth Ramler, was not alive anymore though when he turned one hundred in 1994), Mathematics and Marxism.

During the mid-1950s McCarthy era, Struik's Marxist opinions led to accusations he was a of being a spy for the Soviet Union. He was also cited as an instance of "subversive influence" in a 1952 Senate committee publication. He denied the allegations, and was called Called before the House Un-American Activities Committee. Struik refused to answer any of the over 200 questions asked of him, repeatedly invoking the First and Fifth Amendments of the U.S. Constitution. He was suspended from teaching for five years (with full salary) by MIT in the 1950s. Struik was re-instated in 1956. He retired from MIT in 1960.

Aside from purely academic work, Struik also helped found the journal Science & Society, a Marxian journal on the history, sociology and development of science.

In 1950 Struik published his Lectures on Classical Differential Geometry, which gained praise from Ian R. Porteous:
Of all the textbooks on elementary differential geometry published in the last fifty years the most readable is one of the earliest, namely that by D.J. Struik (1950). He is the only one to mention Allvar Gullstrand.

Struik's other major works include such classics as A Concise History of Mathematics (1948), Yankee Science in the Making, The Birth of the Communist Manifesto, and A Source Book in Mathematics, 1200–1800, all of which are considered standard textbooks or references.

Struik died October 21, 2000, three weeks after celebrating his 106th birthday.

Books 
 1928: Het Probleem ‘De impletione loci’ (Dutch), Nieuw Archief voor Wiskunde, Series 2, 15 (1925–1928), no. 3, 121–137 
 1948: Yankee Science in the Making
 1950: Lectures on Classical Differential Geometry
 1953: Lectures on Analytic and Projective Geometry, Addison-Wesley
 1957: The Origins of American Science (New England) via Internet Archive
 1986: (editor) A Source Book in Mathematics, 1200–1800, Princeton University Press ,  (pbk).
 1987: A Concise History of Mathematics, fourth revised edition, Dover Publications , .

References

Sources
Obituaries
 G. Alberts, and W. T. van Est, Dirk Jan Struik, Levensberichten en herdenkingen (Koninklijke Nederlandse Akademie van Wetenschappen, 2002), pp. 107–114. 
 MIT News Office (2000-10-25). Mathematician Professor Dirk Struik dies at 106. Massachusetts Institute of Technology, accessed 2007-07-23

External links
 
 zbmath Dirk Jan Struik
 Dirk Jan Stuik from Tufts University
 
 
 

20th-century Dutch mathematicians
Historians of science
American historians of mathematics
Mathematics educators
American Marxist historians
Dutch communists
Leiden University alumni
Academic staff of Utrecht University
Massachusetts Institute of Technology School of Science faculty
Academic staff of the Delft University of Technology
Dutch centenarians
Men centenarians
1894 births
2000 deaths
Scientists from Rotterdam
People from Belmont, Massachusetts
Dutch emigrants to the United States